Octavian Popescu may refer to:

Octavian Popescu (footballer, born 1938)
Octavian Popescu (footballer, born 1985)
Octavian Popescu (footballer, born 2002)